Nataša Stanković Pandya (born 4 March 1992) is a Serbian dancer, model and actress based in Mumbai, India. She made her debut in Bollywood films with the political drama Satyagraha directed by Prakash Jha. In 2014, she participated in Bigg Boss 8. She also participated in Nach Baliye 9. Hardik Pandya and Natasa Stankovic were married amid the nationwide lockdown due to COVID-19. On 14 February 2023, Hardik Pandya and Nataša Stanković renewed their wedding vows in a Christian wedding ceremony in Udaipur, Rajasthan.

Early life 

Stanković was born on 4 March 1992 in Požarevac, Republic of Serbia, SFR Yugoslavia to Goran Stanković and Radmila Stanković. She has a brother named Nenad Stanković.

Career
In 2012, Stanković moved to India to pursue a career in acting. She started her career as a model for brands Johnson & Johnson. In 2013, she made her Hindi film debut with the film Satyagraha, directed by Prakash Jha, where she appeared in the dance number "Aiyo Ji" opposite Ajay Devgn. Later in 2014, she appeared in Bigg Boss 8, where she stayed in the house for one month. She gained popularity when she appeared in the popular dance number "DJ Waley Babu"by Badshah and Aastha Gill. 

In 2016, she appeared in the film 7 Hours to Go, directed by Saurabh Varma. In the film, she played the role of a cop and performed in action scenes. In 2017, Stanković was featured in the popular dance number "Mehbooba"from the film Fukrey Returns, for which she was praised. 

In 2018, she appeared in a cameo in the film Zero, directed by Aanand L. Rai, alongside Shah Rukh Khan, Anushka Sharma and Katrina Kaif. Stanković made her digital debut in 2019 with the web series The Holiday by Zoom Studios alongside Adah Sharma. She was seen in the dance reality television series Nach Baliye 9 alongside Aly Goni.

Filmography

Films

Television

Music videos

References

External links

  

1992 births
Living people
People from Požarevac
Serbian film actresses
Serbian female models
Serbian female dancers
Serbian expatriates in India
Actresses in Hindi cinema
Actresses in Tamil cinema
Actresses in Kannada cinema
European actresses in India
Actresses of European descent in Indian films
Bigg Boss (Hindi TV series) contestants